L.O.V.E. (Living Out of Various Emotions) is the fifth studio album by South African singer-songwriter and music producer Zonke. It was released on June 14, 2018, in South Africa by Sony Music Entertainment. It features a production from Zonke Dikana,
Alex D. Samuel, Herb Powers Jr. The album features a guest appearance by Kwesta.

It has been certified platinum by Recording Industry of South Africa  (RiSA).

Commercial Performance
The album  was certified with a gold plaque within five months after its release by the Recording industry of South Africa (RiSA) with sales of over 20,000 copies.

Accolades
L.O.V.E. earned Zonke awards and nominations. 
At the 25th annually ceremony of South African Music Awards, L.O.V.E. was nominated  for Album of the Year, Female Artist of the Year and won Best R&B/Soul Album

|-
|rowspan="3"|2018
|rowspan="3"|<div style="text-align: center;">L.O.V.E.
|Album of the Year
|
|-
|Best R&B/Soul Album
|
|-
|Female Artist of the Year
|

Tracklisting

Certifications

Personnel 
All credits adapted  from discogs.

Instrument 
 Amaechi Ikechi - Bass Guitar  
 Guitar – Cameron Ward , Khumo Kganyago , Shawn Van Staden 
 Alex D. Samuel - Keyboards, Piano, Synthesizer  
 Mixed By – Don Laka , Jürgen Von Wechmar , Mazwe Mtetwa 
 Mabeleng Moholo  - Percussion

Production 

 Zonke Dikana - Producer, Lyrics, Music, Arranged, Lead Vocals, Backing Vocals 
 Alex D. Samuel, Oyama Songo - Recording Engineer 
 Herb Powers Jr. - Mastered

Release history

References

Zonke albums
2018 albums